I Demand Payment is a 1938 American drama film directed by Clifford Sanforth and starring Betty Burgess, Jack La Rue and Matty Kemp. The film was based on Rob Eden's 1932 novel Second Choice. Sanforth produced the film and Sherman L. Lowe wrote the screenplay. I Demand Payment was produced by Poverty Row company Imperial Pictures.

Synopsis
A man finds himself drawn in too deep after going to work for a loan shark, and his new wife tries to leave him after discovering his true occupation.

Cast
Betty Burgess as Judith Avery 
Jack La Rue as Smiles Badolio
Matty Kemp as Toby Locke
Guinn "Big Boy" Williams as Happy Crofton
Lloyd Hughes as Doctor Craig Mitchell
Anthony Orlando as Louie Badolio
Sheila Terry as Rita Avery
Bryant Washburn as Joe Travis
Donald Kirke as Mr. Twitchett
Harry Holman as Justice of Peace
Edward Keene as District Attorney
Norma Taylor as Miss Farnsworth

Reception 
Billboard wrote that it was "a powerful illustration that crime does not pay". Variety'''s review described the film as featuring "The loan-shark racket framed in an undistinguished production" and as "Imperial's contribution to the gangster cycle." It noted, "It provides an hour's entertainment for fans with time to kill who do not care how they kill it.... Bright spots in the production are Jack La Rue and Matty Kemp, standouts in unsympathetic parts, and Betty Burgess as the femme lead. La Rue's strong personality and intensity as a strong-arm guy practically dominates the entire proceedings... Story progresses in routine fashion until the melodramatic climax where Kemp is cornered in his hideout after fleeing gang vengeance... Action fans who like plenty of gun-play will get it here". The New York Daily News rated it two stars, stating in its review that "Matty Kemp tries desperately to give a fine performance in a film distinctly amateurish." The Film Daily stated that the film "rates weak with amateur script and direction" and called the photography "fair".

References

Bibliography
 Pitts, Michael R. Poverty Row Studios, 1929–1940''. McFarland & Company, 2005.

External links
 

1938 films
1938 drama films
American drama films
American black-and-white films
Films based on American novels
1930s English-language films
Films directed by Clifford Sanforth
1930s American films